Peter Stumpf may refer to:

Peter Stumpp (d. 1589) or Peter Stumpf, tried as a werewolf in 1589
Peter Stumpf (cellist), principal cello of the Los Angeles Philharmonic orchestra
Peter P. Stumpf Jr. (1948–2010), American politician and businessman

also may refer to:
Peter Štumpf (born 1962), Slovenian Roman Catholic prelate